Everything But the Girl may refer to:

Everything but the Girl, a British band
Everything but the Girl (album), album by Everything but the Girl
Everything But the Girl (song), a song by Swedish singer Darin